Roine Carlsson (10 December 1937 – 25 August 2020) was a Swedish social democratic politician. Carlsson was appointed Minister of Defence in 1985 and was a member of the Swedish parliament 1985–1991.

References

Fakta om folkvalda: Riksdagen 1985–1988, Stockholm 1986  p. 65

1937 births
2020 deaths
Swedish Ministers for Defence
Members of the Riksdag from the Social Democrats
Swedish Ministers for Communications